Culex (Eumelanomyia) campilunati is a species of mosquito belonging to the genus Culex. It is endemic to Sri Lanka. first documented from Moon Plains at Nuwara Eliya.

References

campilunati
Insects described in 1948